The 1999 Nigerian Senate election in Cross River State was held on February 20, 1999, to elect members of the Nigerian Senate to represent Cross River State. John James Akpan Udo-Edehe representing Cross River North, and Matthew Mbu representing Cross River Central won on the platform of the Peoples Democratic Party, while Florence Ita Giwa representing Cross River South won on the platform of All Nigeria Peoples Party.

Overview

Summary

Results

Cross River North 
The election was won by John James Akpan Udo-Edehe of the Peoples Democratic Party.

Cross River Central 
The election was won by Matthew Mbu of the People's Democratic Party.

Cross River South 
The election was won by Florence Ita Giwa of the All Nigeria Peoples Party.

References 

Cro
Cro
Cross River State Senate elections